WRNZ (105.1 FM, "Z105") is a radio station broadcasting a hot adult contemporary format. Licensed to Lancaster, Kentucky, United States, the station serves the Lexington and Central Kentucky area. The station is currently owned by Hometown Broadcasting of Lancaster, Inc.

History
The station went on the air as WHBK on 1987-12-08.  on 1988-02-19, the station changed its call sign to WTCF, on 1988-06-07 to the current WRNZ,

References

External links

RNZ
Radio stations established in 1988
Hot adult contemporary radio stations in the United States
1988 establishments in Kentucky
Lancaster, Kentucky